Verner Lundström, born 30 January 1901 in Arvidsjaur, Sweden, dead 18 October 1983 Glommersträsk, Sweden, was a Swedish cross-country skier. He won Vasaloppet in 1930.

References 

Swedish male cross-country skiers
Vasaloppet winners
1901 births
1983 deaths